Narkatiaganj Assembly constituency is an assembly constituency in Paschim Champaran district in the Indian state of Bihar.

Overview
As per orders of Delimitation of Parliamentary and Assembly constituencies Order, 2008, 3. Narkatiaganj Assembly constituency is composed of the following: Dhumnagar, Shikarpur, Hardi Tedha, Malda Maldi, Semari, Manwa Parsi, Chamua, Nautanwa, Dumaria, Binawalia, Maldahiya Pokhariya, Kehunia Roari, Parorahan, Purainia Harsari, Rajpur Tumkaria, Sugauli, Kundilpur, Bheriharwa, Gokhula, Kesharia, Kukura, Serahwa, Rakahi
Champapur, Banwaria, Bhasurari gram panchayats and Narkatiaganj notified area of Narkatiganj community development block; Telpur, Deurawa, Bagahi Basawaria, Dhobini, Gonauli Dumra and Lakar Sisai gram panchayats of Lauriya CD Block.

Narkatiaganj Assembly constituency is part of 1. Valmiki Nagar (Lok Sabha constituency).

Members of Legislative Assembly

 ^ By Election in 2014.

Election results

2020

2015

Assembly By-Elections 2014

2010

References

External links
 

Assembly constituencies of Bihar
Politics of West Champaran district